Krischka Stoffels, is a Namibian filmmaker. Krischka has made several critically acclaimed films including Gesie in die glas and Tjiraa. Apart from direction, she is also a producer, writer, cinematographer and editor.

Personal life
She was born in Windhoek, Namibia.

Career
In 2010, she made her maiden short, Gesie in die glas, which won the Special Mention Award at the Namibian Film and Theater Awards. With the success, she made her second short Tjiraa. The film follows Vezuva, a young Ovaherero woman who returns from her studies abroad, in Germany, only to discover that her married cousin has passed away, and that according to tradition, she is expected to marry her cousin's widower. The film was financed by the Namibia Film Commission and was selected for screening at multiple international film festivals, including the African Diaspora International Film Festival.

Filmography

References

External links
 
 
 Kortflieks op selfone: Die Eco-Kids Namibia-rolprentprojek is verlede week in Windhoek bekend gestel

Living people
Namibian film directors
People from Windhoek
Namibian film producers
Year of birth missing (living people)